A mother goddess is a goddess who represents a personified deification of motherhood, fertility, creation, destruction, or the earth goddess who embodies the bounty of the earth or nature. When equated with the earth or the natural world, such goddesses are sometimes referred to as the Mother Earth or Earth Mother, deity in various animistic or pantheistic religions.   The earth goddess is usually the wife or feminine counterpart of the Sky Father or Father Heaven. In some polytheistic cultures, such as the Ancient Egyptian religion which narrates the cosmic egg myth, the sky is instead seen as the Heavenly Mother or Sky Mother as in Nut and Hathor, and the earth god is regarded as the male, paternal, and terrestrial partner, as in Osiris or Geb who hatched out of the maternal cosmic egg.

Excavations at Çatalhöyük

Between 1961 and 1965 James Mellaart led a series of excavations at Çatalhöyük, north of the Taurus Mountains in a fertile agricultural region of South-Anatolia. Striking were the many statues found here, which Mellaart suggested represented a Great goddess, who headed the pantheon of an essentially matriarchal culture. A seated female figure, flanked by what Mellaart describes as lionesses, was found in a grain-bin; she may have intended to protect the harvest and grain. He considered the sites as shrines, with especially the Seated Woman of Çatalhöyük capturing the imagination. There was also a large number of sexless figurines, which Mellaart regarded as typical for a society dominated by women: Emphasis on sex in art is invariably connected with male impulse and desire. The idea that there could have been a matriarchy and a cult of the mother goddess was supported by archaeologist Marija Gimbutas. This gave rise to a modern cult of the Mother Goddess with annual pilgrimages being organized at Çatalhöyük.

Since 1993, excavations were resumed, now headed by Ian Hodder with Lynn Meskell as head of the Stanford Figurines Project that examined the figurines of Çatalhöyük. This team came to different conclusions than Gimbutas and Mellaart. Only a few of the figurines were identified as female and these figurines were found not so much in sacred spaces, but seemed to have been discarded randomly, sometimes in garbage heaps. This rendered a cult of the mother goddess in this location as unlikely.

Ancient Egypt 
In Egyptian mythology, sky goddess Nut is sometimes called "Mother" because she bore stars and Sun god.

Nut was thought to draw the dead into her star-filled sky, and refresh them with food and wine.

Hinduism

In Hinduism, Saraswati, Lakshmi, Radha, Parvati, Durga and other goddesses represents both the feminine aspect and the shakti (power) of the supreme being known as the Brahman. The divine mother goddess, manifests herself in various forms, representing the universal creative force. She becomes Mother Nature (Mula Prakriti), who gives birth to all life forms and nourishes them through her body. Ultimately she re-absorbs all life forms back into herself, or "devours" them to sustain herself as the power of death feeding on life to produce new life. She also gives rise to Maya (the illusory world) and to prakriti, the force that galvanizes the divine ground of existence into self-projection as the cosmos.

The Shakti sect is strongly associated with Samkhya, and Tantra Hindu philosophies and ultimately, is monist. The primordial feminine creative-preservative-destructive energy, Shakti, is considered to be the motive force behind all action and existence in the phenomenal cosmos. The cosmos itself is  purusha, the unchanging, infinite, immanent, and transcendent reality that is the divine ground of all being, the "world soul". This masculine potential is actualized by feminine dynamism, embodied in multitudinous goddesses who are ultimately all manifestations of the one great mother. Shakti, herself, can free the individual from demons of ego, ignorance, and desire that bind the soul in maya (illusion). Practitioners of the Tantric tradition focus on Shakti to free themselves from the cycle of karma.

The worship of the mother deity can be traced back to early Vedic culture. The Rigveda calls the divine female power Mahimata (R.V. 1.164.33) which means "great mother".

Christianity 

Both the Catholic Church and the Orthodox Church revere Virgin Mary as the Mother of God, a rendering of Theotokos and Deipara since the Ecumenical Council of Ephesus in 431 AD, and disregard Protestant objections to Marian devotion. She is regarded as "Our Mother", the Blessed Mother, or the Holy Mother as she gave birth to Jesus Christ, since Christians alike refer to themselves as "Brothers and Sisters in Christ". There is a Pater Noster but no equivalent Mater Nostra, however the Hail Mary and the Sub Tuum Praesidium have been popular forms of prayer and praise to Virgin Mary for many centuries. Some may perceive a parallel in calling Mary "Our Mother" and the Almighty Yahweh as "Our Father". In contrast to the Pagan notion of a fertility goddess, Mary is both the Perpetual Virgin and the Mother of God at the same time, she is not considered the "Heavenly Mother" in reference to God the Father or the "Heavenly Father" as her consort. St Mary has never been referred to as a goddess in the Gospel's accounts of the Annunciation, Wedding at Cana, or the Magnificat. The Orthodox Church since the Apostolic age have believed that Mary entered heaven alive after her death and subsequent resurrection, known as the Dormition; while Catholics led by the Pontifex teach that her body and soul were taken up, without death or resurrection into heaven (Assumption of Mary). As the foremost saint, some Christians believe she continues to supernaturally intervene in the world through Marian apparitions (Our Lady of Velankanni), Marian shrines (Our Lady of Zeitoun)& Marian devotions (Our Lady of the Rosary). According to Mariology and Scholasticism branches of study, though Mary is venerated as the foremost saint, she is still a creature and never viewed as an equal of the Triune God who is the Creator.

In pre-Islamic Arabia, Collyridians were an unorthodox Christian denomination who reportedly worshipped Virgin Mary by making burnt offerings of dough to her. Ancient Christians viewed the Collyridians as heretics, holding that Mary was only to be honoured, and not to be worshipped like the God-man of Christianity.

Latter Day Saint movement

In the Latter Day Saint movement, particularly the Church of Jesus Christ of Latter-day Saints, many adherents believe in a Heavenly Mother as the wife of God the Father. The theology varies, however, according to denomination. The only clear declaration regarding a Heavenly Mother figure is that she exists. Some offshoot denominations disavow a belief in her, some do not make her a part of the official doctrine, and others openly acknowledge her.

New religious movements

Zahng Gil-jah is a South Korean woman, by the World Mission Society Church of God believed to be “God the Mother” (pronounced ). Church members may also call her “New Jerusalem Mother”, “Mother Jerusalem”, or “Heavenly Mother”.

In Theosophy, the Earth goddess is called the "Planetary Logos of Earth".

The Mother Goddess, or Great Goddess, is a composite of various feminine deities from past and present world cultures, worshiped by modern Wicca and others broadly known as Neopagans. She is considered sometimes identified as a Triple Goddess, who takes the form of Maiden, Mother, and Crone archetypes.  She is described as Mother Earth, Mother Nature, or the Creatress of all life. She is associated with the full moon and stars, the Earth, and the sea. In Wicca, the Earth Goddess is sometimes called Gaia. The name of the mother goddess varies depending on the Wiccan tradition.  English historian Ronald Hutton, however, has forcefully stated that any use of the term "Mother-Goddess" can be accounted for, and disregarded, as the scholars and mythographers' own projection of the Virgin Mary onto the evidence and source data. More recently Hutton was criticized in a review for ignoring the evidence of numerous goddesses identified as either mothers or both virgin and mother in pre-Christian antiquity, in addition to providing no evidence or secondary citations with which to substantiate his own position.

Carl Gustav Jung suggested that the archetypal mother was a part of the collective unconscious of all humans; various adherents of Jung, most notably Erich Neumann and Ernst Whitmont, have argued that such an archetype underpins many of its own mythologies and may even precede the image of the paternal "father." Such speculations help explain the universality of such mother goddess imagery around the world.

The Upper Paleolithic Venus figurines have been sometimes explained as depictions of an Earth Goddess similar to Gaia.

In the Baha'i Faith, Baha'u'llah uses the Mother as an attribute of God: "And when He Who is well-grounded in all knowledge, He Who is the Mother, the Soul, the Secret, and the Essence thereof, revealeth that which is the least contrary to their desire, they bitterly oppose Him and shamelessly deny Him.". Baha'u'llah further writes that "Every single letter proceeding out of the mouth of God is indeed a Mother Letter, and every word uttered by Him Who is the Well Spring of Divine Revelation is a Mother Word, and His Tablet a Mother Tablet."

Prehistoric matriarchy debate 

There is difference of opinion between the academic and the popular conception of the term Mother goddess. The popular view is mainly driven by the Goddess movement and reads that primitive societies initially were matriarchal, worshipping a sovereign, nurturing, motherly earth goddess. This was based upon the nineteenth-century ideas of unilineal evolution of Johann Jakob Bachofen. According to the academic view, however, both Bachofen and the modern Goddess theories are a projection of contemporary world views on ancient myths, rather than attempting to understand the mentalité of that time. Often this is accompanied by a desire for a lost civilization from a bygone era that would have been just, peaceful, and wise. However, it is highly unlikely that such a civilization ever existed.

For a long time, feminist authors claimed that these peaceful, matriarchal agrarian societies were exterminated or subjugated by nomadic, patriarchal warrior tribes. An important contribution to this was that of archaeologist Marija Gimbutas. Her work in this field has been questioned. Among feminist archaeologists this vision is nowadays also considered highly controversial.

Since the 1960s, especially  in popular culture, the alleged worship of the mother goddess and the social position that women in prehistoric societies supposedly assumed, were linked. This made the debate a political one. According to the goddess movement, the current male-dominated society should  return to the egalitarian matriarchy of earlier times. That this form of society ever existed was supposedly supported by many figurines that were found.

In academic circles, this prehistoric matriarchy is considered unlikely. Firstly, worshiping a mother goddess does not necessarily mean that women ruled society. In addition, the figurines can also portray ordinary women or goddesses, and it is unclear whether there really ever was a mother goddess.

List of mother goddesses

See also
Astrotheology
List of fertility deities
Shekhinah

Notes

References

Bibliography 

 
 Bickmore, Barry R., "Mormonism in the Early Jewish Christian Milieu", Mormonism in the Early Jewish Christian Milieu (1999).
 Derr, Jill Mulvay, "The Significance of 'O My Father' in the Personal Journey of Eliza R. Snow", BYU Studies 36, no. 1 (1996–97): 84–126.
 Feder, K.L. (2010): Encyclopedia of Dubious Archaeology. From Atlantis to the Walam Olum, Greenwood
 Gimbutas, M. (1989): The Language of the Goddess, Thames & Hudson
 Gimbutas, M. (1991): The Civilization of the Goddess
 Hinckley, Gordon B., "Daughters of God", Ensign, November 1991: 97–100.
 Hodder, I. (2010): Religion in the Emergence of Civilization. Çatalhöyük as a Case Study, Cambridge University Press
 James, S.L.; Dillon, S. (ed.), (2012): A Companion to Women in the Ancient World, Wiley-Blackwell
 Jorgensen, Danny L., "The Mormon Gender-Inclusive Image of God", Journal of Mormon History, 27, No. 1 (Spring 2000): 95–126.
 Joseph's Speckled Bird, Letter to the Editor, Times and Seasons 6: 892 (1 May 1845).
 Mellaart, J., (1967): Catal Huyuk. A Neolithic Town in Anatolia, McGraw-Hill
 Monaghan, P. (2014): Encyclopedia of Goddesses and Heroines, New World Library
 Motz, L. (1997): The Faces of the Goddess, Oxford University Press
 Origen, Origen's Commentary on the Gospel of John: Book II, ¶6.  Included in The Ante-Nicene Fathers, 10 vols. (Buffalo: The Christian Literature Publishing Company, 1885–1896) 10:329–330.
 Pearson, Carol Lynn, "Mother Wove the Morning: a one-woman play"  (October 1992) (depicting, according to the video's description, Eliza R. Snow as one of "sixteen women [who] throughout history search for God the Mother and invite her back into the human family").
 Pratt, Orson, Journal of Discourses 18:292 (12 November 1876).
 Singh, U. (2008): A History of Ancient and Early Medieval India. From the Stone Age to the 12th Century, Pearson Education India
 Smith, Joseph F. et al., "The Origin of Man", Improvement Era (November 1909): 80.
 Smith, Joseph, King Follett Discourse, 7 April 1844, published in Times and Seasons 5 (15 August 1844): 612–17, and reprinted in the History of The Church of Jesus Christ of Latter-day Saints, edited by B. H. Roberts, 2d ed. rev. (Salt Lake City: Deseret Book, (1976–1980), 6:302–17; see also "The Christian Godhead—Plurality of Gods", History of the Church, 6: 473–79.
 Smith, A.C. (2007): Powerful Mysteries. Myth and Politics in Virginia Woolf, ProQuest
 Wesler, K.W. (2012): An Archaeology of Religion, University Press of America
 Wilcox, Linda P., "The Mormon Concept of a Mother in Heaven", Sisters in Spirit: Mormon Women in Historical and Cultural Perspective, edited by Maureen Ursenbach Beecher and Lavina Fielding Anderson (Urbana: University of Illinois Press, 1987), 64–77.  Also Wilcox, Linda P., "The Mormon Concept of a Mother in Heaven", Women and Authority: Re-emerging Mormon Feminism, edited by Maxine Hanks (Salt Lake: Signature Books, 1992), 3–18 Women and Authority – 01 |
 Woodruff, Wilford, Journal of Discourses 18:31–32 (27 June 1875).

Further reading

External links 

 
Comparative mythology
Creator goddesses
Earth goddesses
Feminist spirituality
Fertility goddesses
Jungian archetypes
Mythological archetypes
Nature goddesses
Sky and weather goddesses